Mia Brookes (born 19 January 2007) is a British snowboarder who won the slopestyle event at the FIS Freestyle Ski and Snowboarding World Championships 2023, and came second in the 2022–23 FIS Snowboard World Cup slopestyle event in Laax, Switzerland.

Early life
Brookes is from Sandbach, Cheshire, England. She learned to snowboard aged 18 months, at a ski centre in Stoke-on-Trent where her grandfather worked. Her parents spent five ski seasons in Chamonix, France when Brookes was young, and she also continued her snowboarding at Chill Factore. Brookes has attended Sandbach High School; during the COVID-19 pandemic, she studied remotely so that she could compete in snowboard events in mainland Europe.

Career
Brookes has trained in Laax, Switzerland, Livigno, Italy, and Hintertux, Austria. She joined the GB Snowsport programme at the age of 10,  and aged 11, she competed at the 2018 British Snowboard Championships in Laax.

In December 2020, Brookes made her international debut, finishing second in a Europa Cup event in Piz Corvatsch. She was unable to compete in FIS Snowboard World Cup events until she was 15 years old. In 2022, she won the junior big air world championship event, and finished second in the slopestyle event. She was unable to qualify for the 2022 Winter Olympics, as she was too young. She finished second in the 2022–23 FIS Snowboard World Cup slopestyle event in Laax, and came sixth in the event at the 2023 X Games.

Brookes won the slopestyle event at the FIS Freestyle Ski and Snowboarding World Championships 2023. At the age of 16, she was the youngest ever snowboard world champion and the first British person to win a snowboard slopestyle world title. In her winning routine, she became the first woman to land a CAB 1440 in competition.

References

External links

GB Snowsport Profile

2007 births
Living people
English female snowboarders
People from Sandbach
Sportspeople from Cheshire